The Zambia Riverside Solar Power Station is a 34 megawatts solar power plant in Zambia. The privately owned solar farm was originally commissioned in April 2018, as a 1 MW power station by Copperbelt Energy Corporation (CEC), who own the energy infrastructure. In December 2021, CEC signed a engineering, procurement, and construction (EPC) contract with Sinohydro to expand the solar farm to 34 MW over the next 12 months. CEC plans to transmit and distribute the energy to its customers in the Copperbelt Province of Zambia.

Location
The geographical coordinates of Zambia Riverside Solar Power Station are: 12°48'26.0"S, 28°14'11.0"E (Latitude:-12.807222; Longitude:28.236389).

Overview
In April 2018, CEC commenced commercial use of its 1 MW solar power station in Kitwe, as an income-diversification enterprise. In December 2021, CEC contracted Sinohydro to expand the solar farm to 34 MW, with anticipated annual output of 56.5 GWh. The power station, whose original design consisted of 3,864 photovoltaic panels, each rated at 270 watts, was the first grid-connected solar plant in Zambia. The expansion includes construction of new 11kV evacuation transmission lines to a location where the energy will enter the CEC grid.

Construction costs and timeline
The construction costs for the expansion are reported as US$19.2 million, paid by CEC. Construction is expected to last approximately one year and conclude during the fourth quarter of 2022.

Recent developments
In February 2023, the completed 34 MW solar farm was officially commissioned in the presence of Hakainde Hichilema, the Zambian Head of State. Its annual output is calculated at 54.7 GWh, enough to energize 10,000 Zambian homes.

During expansion, 800 people were employed over a 10 months period at a total cost of US$22 million. During the expansion, 61,300 panels, connected to 150 solar inverters were installed.
transmission line and six transformer stations.

See also

 List of power stations in Zambia
 ZESCO

References

External links
 CEC, Sinohydro In Solar Project Deal As of 22 November 2022.

Solar power stations in Zambia
Kitwe
Copperbelt Province
2018 establishments in Zambia